Acropora echinata is a species of acroporid coral that was first described by Dana in 1846. The species is listed as vulnerable on the IUCN Red List, and has a decreasing population. It is not common but found over a large area, and is listed under CITES Appendix II.

Description
Acropora echinata colonies are made of flat, bottlebrush-like branches, with thin neatly-arranged branchlets. The tips of these branchlets are blue or purple, and the species is generally white or cream, but can be completely blue. The incipient axial and the axial corallites are indistinguishable, and the radial corallites are tube-shaped and short, and are not obvious or do not exist.

Distribution
Acropora echinata is uncommon but occurs over a large range; Palau, central Pacific, Southeast Asia, the Indo-Pacific, Australia, the Indian Ocean, the East China Sea, and Japan. It has been found in five of the six regions of Indonesia, and was seen at 17 locations in the Marshall Islands. There is no population data for the species, but it is known to be decreasing. This species has a very low resistance to bleaching by the change in water temperature, with all specimens in Palau being affected, as of 1998. The decline of coral reefs,  coral disease, fishing, climate change, acidification of oceans, pollution, and being prey to Acanthaster planci also affect the species. It is listed as a vulnerable species on the IUCN Red List, and also on CITES Appendix II.

Taxonomy
It was first described by Dana in 1846 as Madrepora echinata, and was later classed as a synonym of Madrepora durvillei by Milne Edwards in 1860, and then as a synonym of Madrepora procumbens by Brook in 1892. It was later described as a different species, Acropora echinata.

References

Acropora
Cnidarians of the Pacific Ocean
Cnidarians of the Indian Ocean
Marine fauna of Asia
Marine fauna of Oceania
Marine fauna of Southeast Asia
Vulnerable fauna of Asia
Vulnerable fauna of Oceania
Corals described in 1846
Taxa named by James Dwight Dana